Carlos Eduardo Pineda Moreno (born 31 October 1931) is a retired footballer from El Salvador.

Club career
Nicknamed el Monito (The Monkey), Pineda started his career at second division Cosmos and was part of the FAS first team, and holds a moment in history being FAS first goalscorer in 1948, he went on to win four titles (1951–52, 1953–54, 1956-57 y 1961-62). He also had a spell at Atlante.

International career
Pineda represented El Salvador fifteen times scoring 4 goals.

References

External links
 "El Monito Goleador de C.D. FAS" - CD FAS 

1931 births
Living people
Sportspeople from Santa Ana, El Salvador
Association football forwards
Salvadoran footballers
El Salvador international footballers
C.D. FAS footballers